Non-Sport Update (sometimes abbreviated as NSU) is a magazine founded by Roxanne Toser Non-Sport Enterprises, Inc. for collectors of non-sport and entertainment trading cards. Subjects that appear on these types of trading cards are television and movie properties, comic book characters, music icons, product parodies, and many other topics. In February 2016, Non-Sport Update was acquired by Beckett Media.

The first edition of Non-Sport Update was published in 1991. The magazine was published quarterly through 1993. From 1994 through today, Non-Sport Update has been published bimonthly in January, March, May, July, September, and November. The headquarters of the magazine is in Dallas, TX.

Magazine contents
Non-Sport Update magazine includes articles about upcoming trading card products and vintage series. Regular columns include Non-Sport Notes, Promo Column, Cards Online, Non-Sport University, Beyond Non-Sport, and New & Noteworthy. Older issues included New Card Review and Finders Keepers. Each issue includes a price guide with price values for cards from the 1800s through today. One of Non-Sport Update's most popular feature is its included promotional trading cards. The magazine has included over 400 different "promo cards" since its inception.

Variant issues
Variant issues have been a staple of Non-Sport Update publishing schedule since the first one was published in 2001. These issues feature a unique cover and exclusive promotional trading card and are generally published in conjunction with hobby trade shows. Variant issues have been produced in conjunction with many Comic-Con International shows promoting trading card series from Inkworks (four of which have contained Buffy The Vampire Slayer covers) and Upper Deck for their 2008 Marvel Masterpieces series.

Family run
NSU has always been a family-run business. Roxanne Toser served as publisher, Marlin Toser as managing editor, and Harris Toser as production manager. The current editor-in-chief is Alan Biegel. Previous editor-in-chiefs have been Christopher Benjamin, Russell Roberts, Nick Portantiere, and Bernie Mertes.

Other publications
Two books have been published by Non-Sport Update: Promo Card Encyclopedia & Price Guide and The Encyclopedia of Non-Sport & Entertainment Trading Cards. Both books were written by Todd Jordan. Jordan's Promo Card Encyclopedia was published prior to the first publication with Non-Sport Update in 2005. Updated versions of both books are expected in the near future.

Trade shows
Non-Sport Update runs and promotes the Philly Non-Sports Card Show held twice per year in Allentown, PA. The show has been held continuous since the 1980s and was previously run by Frank and Phyllis Reighter. In 2012, Non-Sport Update ran Pop Art Con, an artists' show, in Ft. Washington, PA.

NSU Card Talk
Non-Sport Update has hosted an online forum for collectors since 1999. The forum is one of the most popular trading card destinations online, especially for the non-sport/entertainment trading card niche.

Blog
Non-Sport Update maintains a blog at nsu-magazine.com. The blog began in 2011 and reports on hobby and entertainment news.

References

The Non-Sport Update Staff

External links
 
 NSU Blog
 Philly Non-Sports Card Show

1991 establishments in Pennsylvania
Bimonthly magazines published in the United States
Business magazines published in the United States
Entertainment magazines published in the United States
Hobby magazines published in the United States
Magazines established in 1991
Magazines published in Pennsylvania
Magazines published in Texas
Mass media in Dallas
Quarterly magazines published in the United States
Trading cards